The 2020 United States House of Representatives elections in West Virginia was held on November 3, 2020, to elect the three U.S. representatives from the state of West Virginia, one from each of the state's 3 congressional districts. The elections coincided with the 2020 U.S. presidential election, as well as other elections to the House of Representatives, elections to the United States Senate and various state and local elections.

Republicans held all of their seats in the West Virginia delegation with increased margins from 2018.

Overview

District 1

The 1st district encompasses the industrial areas of the northern Panhandle including Wheeling, Fairmont, Clarksburg, Morgantown, and Parkersburg. The incumbent is Republican David McKinley, who was re-elected with 64.6% of the vote in 2018.

Republican primary

Candidates

Declared
David McKinley, incumbent U.S. Representative

Primary results

Democratic primary

Candidates

Declared
Natalie Cline, computational linguist
Tom Payne, candidate for this seat in 2018

Endorsements

Primary results

General election

Predictions

Endorsements

Results

District 2

The 2nd district is located in the central region of the state, stretching from Charleston into the Eastern Panhandle. The incumbent is Republican Alex Mooney, who was re-elected with 53.9% of the vote in 2018.

Republican primary

Candidates

Declared
Matt Hahn
Alex Mooney, incumbent U.S. Representative

Primary results

Democratic primary

Candidates

Declared
Cathy Kunkel, energy policy analyst

Primary results

General election

Predictions

Endorsements

Results

District 3

The 3rd district encompasses southern West Virginia, taking in Huntington, Bluefield, Princeton and Beckley. The incumbent is Republican Carol Miller, who was elected with 56.4% of the vote in 2018.

Republican primary

Candidates

Declared
Carol Miller, incumbent U.S. Representative
Russell Siegel

Endorsements

Primary results

Democratic primary

Candidates

Declared
Paul E. Davis
Jeff Lewis
Hilary Turner
Lacy Watson

Endorsements

Primary results

General election

Predictions

Results

References

External links
 
 
  (State affiliate of the U.S. League of Women Voters)
 

Official campaign websites for 1st district candidates
 Natalie Cline (D) for Congress 
 David McKinley (R) for Congress

Official campaign websites for 2nd district candidates
 Cathy Kunkel (D) for Congress
 Alex Mooney (R) for Congress

Official campaign websites for 3rd district candidates
 Carol Miller (R) for Congress
 Hilary Turner (D) for Congress

West Virginia
2020
House